Map of places in East Renfrewshire compiled from this list
See the list of places in Scotland for places in other counties.

This is a list of articles about places/areas in the East Renfrewshire council area of Scotland.

 

B
Barrhead 
Busby

C
Clarkston

E
Eaglesham

G
Giffnock

N
Neilston 
Netherlee
Newton Mearns

P
Patterton (Newton Mearns)

S
Stamperland (Clarkston)

T
Thornliebank

U
Uplawmoor

W
Waterfoot
Whitecraigs, Giffnock/Newton Mearns
Williamwood, Clarkston/Netherlee
Woodfarm, Giffnock/Thornliebank

See also
List of places in Scotland

Lists of places in Scotland
Populated places in East Renfrewshire